Zlatko Crnković may refer to:

 Zlatko Crnković (translator) (1931–2013), Croatian translator
 Zlatko Crnković (actor) (1936–2012), Croatian actor